Michael Anthony "Mike" Hill is an American mathematician known for his research in topology. He is a professor at the University of California, Los Angeles. Together with Michael J. Hopkins and Douglas Ravenel, he received the American Mathematical Society's Oswald Veblen Prize in Geometry in 2022 for the paper "On the nonexistence of elements of Kervaire invariant one."

Education 
Hill's undergraduate degree is from Harvard University. He earned a PhD in mathematics from the Massachusetts Institute of Technology in 2006. His doctoral advisor was Michael J. Hopkins. His dissertation, in algebraic topology, was titled "Computational Methods for Higher Real K-Theory with Applications to Tmf."

Career and personal life 
Hill earned tenure at the University of Virginia before moving to the University of California, Los Angeles in 2015.

Hill is a co-founder of Spectra, an association for LGBTQ+ mathematicians. He is also a member of the Spectra board.

References

External links
profile at UCLA

Living people
21st-century American mathematicians
American LGBT scientists
LGBT mathematicians
Massachusetts Institute of Technology alumni
Harvard College alumni
University of California, Los Angeles faculty
University of Virginia faculty
Year of birth missing (living people)